Ohr is a Kabbalistic concept in which light is used as a way of describing divine attributes.

OHR or Ohr may also refer to:

People
Bruce Ohr, American attorney
Fred Ohr (1919–2015), American World War II fighter pilot
George E. Ohr (1857–1918), American art potter
Martine Ohr (born 1964), Dutch field hockey player
Stian Ohr (born 1978), Norwegian footballer

Organizations
Office of the High Representative, in Bosnia and Herzegovina
Ohr (record label), a German record label

See also
Ohr Somayach (disambiguation)